Them Changes may refer to:
 Them Changes (Ramsey Lewis album)
 Them Changes (Buddy Miles album)
 "Them Changes", a song by  Thundercat, from the EP The Beyond / Where the Giants Roam, which later also appears on his 3rd studio album Drunk.